The Ferrovie dello Stato (FS; Italian State Railways) Class 685 is a class of 2-6-2 'Prairie' express train steam locomotives. These are colloquially known as Regine ('Queens' in Italian), mirroring their fame as one of the most successful and appreciated Italian steam locomotives.

Design and construction
The Class 685 was the simple-expansion and superheated version of the pre-existing FS Class 680 locomotive, the premier express locomotive in Italy up to that date; while discarding the complicated compound feature, the 685 nonetheless kept the unusual feature of having the cylinders arranged in pairs, with each pair being served by a single piston valve with crossed ports (a feature typical of the Plancher engine of the Class 680 and other Italian locomotives).

The first 106 locomotives were built up to World War I, and had right-hand drive; construction resumed in 1920, and the remaining 165 were all built, up to 1928, with left-hand drive and a slightly longer boiler. Of the latter, 30 were built from the beginning with Caprotti valve gear, after it had been tested first on a FS Class 740 locomotive and then on other four 685 locomotives; all of these were initially reclassified as FS Class 686 locomotives, but were later placed again into the Class 685.

Operations
The Class 685 was present on all the Italian mainlines before their electrification, thanks to its good performance related to its moderate axle load. It was renowned as a well-balanced design, especially for its very smooth riding qualities, and was almost universally appreciated. Despite being express locomotives, especially in the waning years of the Italian steam they proved to be apt for freight train pulling as well.

The first units to be withdrawn from service, in the mid 1960s, were the heavier S.685 locomotives, and the more maintenance-requiring Caprotti and Franco-Crosti locomotives; the last unit in active service, the 685.222, was withdrawn in early 1975.

Conversions

Rebuilds from the 680 class
The by then-obsolete FS Class 680 locomotives were first subjected to a first rebuild, in which 91 of them were superheated but kept the compound engine (with some of them receiving a larger high pressure (HP) cylinder); after it was determined that these locomotives were still inferior in terms of performance and water and coal consumption, it was decided to rebuild them into Class 685 locomotives, instead.

A further group of 40 locomotives, with the new classification of 685.5XX, also received the Caprotti valve gear, and had a boiler that achieved even higher steam temperatures, to further improve their efficiency; some even received an exhaust injector.

Class S.685

In total, 49 were rebuilt until 1933, while in 1934 a 685.500, was further converted into a S.685. Based on their increased performance (comparable or, in some cases, even superior to the larger FS Class 690 Pacifics), they were classified as the separate Class S.685 ('S' standing for Speciale).

The Class S.685 locomotives mainly operated on the Milan-Venice, Milan-Turin and Rome-Naples (through Cassino) mainlines, especially on the former together with the FS Class 691. After these lines were electrified, respectively in 1958 and 1961, their increased axle load and maintenance needs led to their withdrawal by 1968.

In total, 120 ex-Class 680 locomotives were eventually rebuilt, until 1933, bringing the total number of locomotives in the Class to 391.

Franco-Crosti
In 1939 five locomotives (amongst those fitted with Caprotti valve gear) were rebuilt with Franco-Crosti boilers; initially classified into the Class S.685, in 1951 they were reclassified as FS Class 683.

Turbine locomotive
In 1933 the locomotive 685.410 had her cylinders replaced by a large forward motion steam turbine and a smaller reverse turbine; this experiment, under the guidance of renowned engineer Giuseppe Belluzzo, was completely unsuccessful, and the locomotive was restored to its previous condition in 1934.

Preservation
Five Class 685 locomotives survive into preservation:
 The 685.089 and 196 are currently operational;
 The 685.068 is a static exhibit at the Pietrarsa railway museum;
 The S.685.600 (the 1000th locomotive built by the Ernesto Breda company) is a static exhibit at the Museo della Scienza e della Tecnologia "Leonardo da Vinci";
 The 685.222 is used as a source for spare parts at Pistoia.

References

Bibliography

 
 
 

685
2-6-2 locomotives
Breda locomotives
Reggiane locomotives
Railway locomotives introduced in 1912
Standard gauge locomotives of Italy
1′C1′ h4 locomotives
Passenger locomotives